Mara Ahmed is an interdisciplinary artist and filmmaker based on Long Island, New York. Her production company is Neelum Films.

Early life and education
Mara Ahmed was born in Lahore, Pakistan. She has lived and been educated in Belgium, Pakistan and the United States. She has an MBA and a second master's degree in Economics. She worked in corporate finance before launching her career in film.

Film career

Ahmed's film training began at the Visual Studies Workshop and later continued at the Rochester Institute of Technology. She began to shoot her first documentary, The Muslims I Know, in 2006. The film is a reaction to the post 9/11 negative stereotyping of Muslims in mainstream media. The Muslims I Know premiered at the Dryden Theatre in 2008. It received fiscal sponsorship from New York Women in Film and Television.

Ahmed's second film is the short documentary, Pakistan One on One. It is a survey of public opinion in Pakistan about issues of interest to Americans. The film premiered in 2011 at the Little Theatre. Both films have been broadcast on PBS and have been screened across the US and also abroad.

A Thin Wall, Ahmed's third documentary, was released in April 2015. It focuses on the Partition of India in 1947 and derives lessons that remain relevant today. Shot on both sides of the border, in India and Pakistan, A Thin Wall is a personal take on partition rooted in stories passed down from one generation to another. It is written and directed by Mara Ahmed and co-produced by Indian filmmaker Surbhi Dewan. Both filmmakers are descendants of families displaced by the 1947 Partition. The film's post-production was crowdfunded on Indiegogo. It was successful in reaching a wide audience.

A Thin Wall premiered internationally in May 2015 at the Bradford Literature Festival, UK. It was introduced by British poet John Siddique, whose work is featured in the film. It was also an official selection of the Seattle South Asian Film Festival, San Francisco's 3rd i Film Festival, the New York Indian Film Festival, the South Asian Film Festival of Montréal, the Mustard Seed Film Festival in Philadelphia, and Vancouver's South Asian Film Education Society's Film Screenings for the 70th Anniversary of the Partition. The documentary is now available on Amazon Video and Mubi.

Ahmed was interviewed about A Thin Wall on Rochester Indymedia, Voice of America and RCTV.

She gave a Ted talk about the meaning of borders and nationalism, entitled The Edges that Blur, in 2017. That same year, Ahmed began work on a new documentary inspired by Claudia Rankine's book, Citizen: An American Lyric. The Injured Body: A Film about Racism in America focuses on micro-aggressions via interviews with a diverse group of women of color. It is slated to be released in 2022. The film is fiscally sponsored by New York Women in Film and Television.

Art exhibitions

Mara Ahmed works in a variety of media including film, photography, painting, collage and writing. Her work was featured in the 2005 documentary “Identity Through Art” along with five other Asian-American artists.

Ahmed's artwork was exhibited at the Kinetic Gallery, at SUNY Geneseo, in 2008. “Synthesis” was a multi-media exhibition that captured Ahmed's journey from Pakistan to the US through the fusion of diverse cultures and materials.

In 2014, her collage work, which incorporates painting, photography, and fabrics from Pakistan and India, was exhibited at the Colacino Gallery, at Nazareth College in New York. Titled “This Heirloom”, it was a multi-media exhibit that combined art and film and endeavored to forge a link to the past via personal and collective histories.

"This Heirloom" was shown at the Oakland Asian Cultural Center in 2018. It was part of a retrospective of Ahmed's work. The art series was also exhibited at the Douglass Auditorium, for Current Seen, Rochester's Small Venue Biennial led by Rochester Contemporary Art Center in 2019.

Activism and writing

Ahmed is involved in social justice and community work. She writes and presents regularly on topics related to Pakistan, Islamophobia, micro-aggressions, diversity education and cultural competence.

Ahmed is featured as a changemaker in Rochester Museum and Science Center's exhibit, The Changemakers: Rochester Women Who Changed the World. The exhibit, prompted by the 100th anniversary of the ratification of the 19th Amendment recognizing the right of American women to vote, highlights stories of women visionaries and trailblazers from Rochester, New York.

The Warp & Weft

The Warp & Weft is a transnational, multilingual archive of stories that seeks to capture the 2020 zeitgeist. Ahmed began working on it in September 2020. Audio stories, along with responses to the archive by artists, musicians and dancer performers, were released in collaboration with Rochester Contemporary Art Center over the course of their exhibit "Last Year on Earth," March 5 - May 8, 2021. On February 26, Ahmed spoke about her archive project with Abi Rose of Reclaiming the Narrative.

Articles

Mara Ahmed: Exterminate All the Brutes: a critique, Mondoweiss, May 21, 2021
Mara Ahmed: Decolonizing Art for Art's Sake, The Markaz Review, March 1, 2021
Mara Ahmed: Borders Can Be Borderlands, Mason Street, January 31, 2021
Mara Ahmed: The Unvarnished Truth about Obama, Harris and Diversity without Accountability, The Markaz Review, November 27, 2020
Mara Ahmed: ‘Sultana's Dream’ Project and the Disappearance of Muslim Feminisms, Countercurrents, April 17, 2020
Mara Ahmed: Lessons of the Hour: A Review, Rochester Beacon, April 23, 2019
Mara Ahmed: Conflicting dreams and realities: Amos Oz in Rochester, Mondoweiss, April 31, 2018
Mara Ahmed: Meeting Adversity with Resistance, Socialist Worker, April 26, 2018
Mara Ahmed: Standing Rock is what democracy looks like, Socialist Worker, January 3, 2017
Mara Ahmed: Time to boycott the Democrats, Socialist Worker, October 24, 2016
Mara Ahmed: White Feminists/Black Blobs, Countercurrents, March 21, 2016
Mara Ahmed: Terror Hub or Empire of Fear, Countercurrents, January 7, 2016
Mara Ahmed: The Paris attacks: should France rain flowers?, City Newspaper, December 1, 2015
Mara Ahmed: Love In The Time Of Cholera And Hélène Cixous, Countercurrents, June 17, 2014
Mara Ahmed: Still in Attica after 40 years, Socialist Worker, April 3, 2014
Mara Ahmed: Islamophobia and Racism, Rochester Indymedia, January 30, 2014

References

External links

Year of birth missing (living people)
Living people
American documentary film directors
American people of Pakistani descent
People from Lahore
Visual Studies Workshop alumni